On 20 June 1994, Robin and Margaret Bain and three of their four childrenArawa, Laniet and Stephenwere shot to death in Dunedin, New Zealand. The only suspects were David Cullen Bain, the eldest son and only survivor, and Robin Bain, the father. David Bain, aged 22, was charged with five counts of murder. In May 1995, he was convicted on each of the five counts and sentenced to mandatory life in prison with a minimum non-parole period of sixteen years.

David's case was taken up by businessman and former rugby player Joe Karam. In 2007, his legal team, guided by Karam, successfully appealed to the Privy Council, arguing that Robin Bain was the more likely killer. The Privy Council declared there had been a 'substantial miscarriage of justice'. Bain was released on bail in May 2007. The retrial in June 2009 ended with his acquittal on all charges.

The case has been described as "the most widely discussed and divisive in New Zealand's criminal history". Speculation about it continued long after David was acquitted, including whether or not he should receive compensation for the years he spent in prison. Ian Binnie, a retired justice of the Supreme Court of Canada, was appointed in November 2011 to review the circumstances and advise the government on whether compensation should be paid. Binnie concluded that the Dunedin police made 'egregious errors' and that the 'extraordinary circumstances' in the case justified the payment of compensation. This report was rejected by the Minister of Justice, Judith Collins, on advice from High Court Judge Robert Fisher.

In March 2015, the government appointed Ian Callinan, a retired justice of the High Court of Australia, to conduct a second review of David's compensation claim. Callinan's review concluded that David was not innocent on the balance of probabilities, but the government made an ex gratia payment to him of $925,000 in order to settle the matter.

Family background
Robin Irving Bain and Margaret Arawa Cullen were married in 1969 in Dunedin, New Zealand. They had four children: David (born 1972), Arawa (born 1974), Laniet (born 1976) and Stephen (born 1980). In 1974, they moved to Papua New Guinea, where Robin worked as a missionary teacher. The family returned to New Zealand in 1988. Three years after his return, Robin became the principal of Taieri Beach School.

In June 1994, the family lived at 65 Every Street, Andersons Bay, Dunedin. The house was old and 'semi-derelict'.  Photographs presented at the trial showed most of the rooms were squalid and messy with the family’s belongings strewed in disorderly heaps. At the time of the murders, Robin and Margaret were estranged. Margaret Bain had developed an interest in new-age spiritualism. She referred to her husband as "a son of Belial – one of the Four Crown Princes of Hell". They used to fight and bicker and Margaret told an acquaintance shortly before the murders she would shoot Robin if she could. She refused to let him sleep in the house so he often slept in the back of his van near the school. When he came home on the weekends, he slept in a caravan in the garden.  

At David Bain's third court of Appeal hearing, fellow teachers described Robin at the time of the killings as ‘deeply depressed, to the point of impairing his ability to do his job of teaching children’.  Cyril Wilden, a former teacher and registered psychologist visited the Taieri School, and noted that ‘Robin appeared to be increasingly disorganised and struggling to cope.’  There were piles of unopened mail on his desk and his classroom was ‘dishevelled, disorganised and untidy’.

Laniet had been flatting in Dunedin but also lived with her father in the Taieri schoolhouse. She returned to the family residence on the Sunday evening of 19 June, the day before the murders, to attend a family meeting. At David Bain's retrial, witnesses said the meeting was called because Laniet, aged 18 at the time, wanted to disclose that her father had been committing incest with her prior to the murders.

David Bain was studying music and classics at Otago University and had a part-time job delivering morning newspapers. Arawa was attending teachers' training college (formerly Otago Teachers' College, later Otago University, School of Education) and Stephen was at high school.

Deaths
On the morning of 20 June 1994, after returning from his morning paper run, David called the 111 emergency number at 7:09 am in a distressed state and told the operator: "They're all dead, they're all dead."

When the police arrived they found five members of the Bain family dead, having all suffered gunshot wounds – Robin (58), his wife Margaret (50), their daughters Arawa (19) and Laniet (18), and their son Stephen (14). A message was found typed on a computer that said "sorry, you are the only one who deserved to stay". Four days later, David, aged 22, was charged with five counts of murder.

Two weeks after the murders, the house was burnt down at the request of other family members. In the process, the carpet containing bloody footprints was destroyed - described by Judge Ian Binnie as a 'critical' piece of evidence used to convict David. The footprints were revealed when the carpet was  tested with luminol on the day of the murders. Police officers admitted at the retrial that they should have cut out and retained the carpet with the bloodied footprints.

Legal proceedings

First trial
David Bain's first trial lasted three weeks and took place at the Dunedin High Court in May 1995. The Crown claimed that Bain shot his mother, two sisters and brother before going out on his morning paper run at about 5.45am; that he returned to the house about an hour later, typed a message on the computer and then waited in the lounge for his father to come in from the caravan before shooting him in the head.

The defence argued that Robin Bain shot and killed his wife and children, then turned on the computer, typed in the message to his son that "you are the only one who deserved to stay" and committed suicide.

Dean Cottle, a witness who was expected to testify about Robin Bain's incestuous relationship with his daughter Laniet, failed to show up at court when called. Cottle provided a written statement to this effect but Justice Williamson found him unreliable as a witness and, in his absence, ruled against admission of his testimony.
 
Judge Binnie later noted that the police never came up with a plausible motive for David to kill his entire family, although the prosecution suggested he was 'triggered' by a minor and long-running argument with his father about use of a chainsaw. In summing up, Justice Neil Williamson told the jury that the Crown had said "... that these events were so bizarre and abnormal that it was impossible for the human mind to conceive of any logical or reasonable explanation".

At the conclusion of the trial, Bain was convicted by the jury on five counts of murder and sentenced to life imprisonment with a sixteen-year non-parole period.

Support of Joe Karam 
Former All Black rugby player, Joe Karam, became interested in the case in 1996, when he read a newspaper article about some long-haired university students trying to raise money for David's appeal by selling jam. He gave them some money and then studied the evidence presented at the original trial.  He felt "something was wrong" with the case and spearheaded a lengthy campaign to have David's convictions overturned. He visited him in prison over 200 times and wrote four books about the case. Karam stated in his books that "[Bain's] innocence is the only possible conclusion" and that he was "totally innocent". Karam was subsequently described in some media as a 'freedom fighter' and his support helped bring about a retrial in 2009 at which David was found not guilty.

Karam's support for David came at considerable personal cost. He used to be a millionaire owning more than 20 investment properties. He no longer owns these. He worked fulltime on David's case up until the 2003 appeal and friends estimate he lost up to $4 million in terms of his time, loss of earnings and costs of legal and forensic experts. Journalist, Amanda Spratt, wrote: "Ten years down the track, the friends and fortune have gone. The woman he loved left him, he sold his home and he doesn’t bother going to dinner parties any more, sick of them ending in an argument and a walk-out."

Appeals
The first application was made to the New Zealand Court of Appeal in 1995, principally on whether the trial judge had erred in refusing to admit Cottle's testimony. The Court refused to hear the appeal on the grounds that the "Crown case appeared very strong and the defence theory not at all plausible."

In June 1998, Bain petitioned the Governor-General for a pardon, which was then passed on to the Ministry of Justice. In 2000, Justice Minister Phil Goff said the investigation had shown that "a number of errors" may have occurred in the Crown's case against Bain.

Privy Council
In March 2007, Bain's legal team, including Karam, travelled to London to lay out nine arguments before the Privy Council as to why his convictions should be quashed. Two of the nine points concerned Robin's mental state and possible motive including the possibility that he was "facing the public revelation of very serious sex offences against his teenage daughter". The other seven points concerned questions about particular pieces of evidence. The Privy Council said there was considerable doubt that Bain would have been convicted if evidence discovered post-trial had been put to the jury.

The Privy Council concluded that: "In the opinion of the board, the fresh evidence adduced in relation to the nine points ... taken together, compels the conclusion that a substantial miscarriage of justice has actually occurred in this case." The Privy Council quashed Bain's convictions and ordered a retrial, but noted that he should remain in custody in the meantime.

On 15 May 2007, Bain was granted bail by the High Court in Christchurch. Justice Fogarty said that under New Zealand law, there was no reason for continued detention and he was bailed to the home of his longtime supporter Karam. Altogether, he served almost thirteen years of a life sentence with a minimum sixteen-year non-parole period.

Retrial

The retrial took place at the Christchurch High Court, with the jury sworn in on 6 March 2009, and Bain pleaded not guilty to the five murder charges. The defence argued that Robin committed the murders and then committed suicide because he was having an incestuous relationship with daughter, Laniet, which was about to become public. The trial lasted about three months and the jury took less than a day to find Bain not guilty on all five charges.

Some commentators questioned the behaviour of jurors who hugged Bain and attended a "victory party" after the verdict. Chris Gallavin, a senior law lecturer at Canterbury University, said, "While this is unusual behaviour, the whole case is an unusual case."

After the retrial, New Zealand's Chief Coroner consulted with the local coroner and others to decide whether to conduct inquests into the deaths, as the verdict implied the death certificates may not be accurate. However no inquests were held; a Law Society spokesman pointed out that even if the coroner's findings disagreed with the retrial verdict, this could not lead to any further legal action against Bain.

Compensation
In March 2010, Bain lodged an application for compensation for wrongful imprisonment. His case fell outside Cabinet rules on compensation, meaning the government was not obliged to pay him anything, but may do so if he was able to establish his innocence on "the balance of probabilities" and was also considered to be the "victim of exceptional circumstances".

Ian Binnie's report 
Because of the high-profile nature of the case, Justice Minister Simon Power chose an overseas judge – retired Canadian Supreme Court Justice Ian Binnie – to examine Bain's application for compensation. After a year-long investigation, Binnie concluded in September 2012 that "on the balance of probabilities" Bain was innocent of the murders in 1994 and should be paid compensation for wrongful conviction and imprisonment". By the time Binnie's report was completed, Simon Power had retired from Parliament.

Judith Collins, the new Justice Minister, disagreed with Binnie's conclusions and sought feedback from the police, the Solicitor-General and former High Court judge Robert Fisher. Fisher claimed that Binnie had made significant errors of principle and recommended that a new report be undertaken. He acknowledged that a new report could still reach the same conclusion as Binnie. Collins agreed and said another report into Bain's compensation claim would have to be commissioned.[55] Binnie took exception to the criticisms of his report, arguing that he had weighed up the totality of the evidence both for and against Bain. He said the government was clearly "shopping around" for a report that would allow it to dodge paying compensation.

In January 2013, Bain filed a claim in the High Court seeking a review of Collins' actions, alleging Collins had breached natural justice and the New Zealand Bill of Rights Act. In August 2014, Collins resigned and Amy Adams was appointed as the new Justice Minister. The judicial review proceedings against Collins were discontinued in January 2015.

Ian Callinan's report 

Another report was commissioned and retired Australian judge Ian Callinan was given the responsibility to draft it. On 2 August 2016, Adams formally announced that Callinan had found Bain was not innocent "on the balance of probabilities". However, Callinan never interviewed David and was instructed that he was not allowed to read Ian Binnie's report as part of his investigation. When the report was made public, David's legal team indicated they intended to challenge it in court. In response, the government offered to make an ex gratia payment of $925,000 provided David dropped all legal challenges.

Public opinion 

The majority of respondents to opinion polls conducted in 2012, 2013 and 2015 thought Bain should receive compensation for the time he spent in prison.

Cost to the taxpayer 

The total cost to the taxpayer of the David Bain legal case was nearly $7 million. The 2009 retrial cost more than $4 million, making it the most expensive trial in New Zealand history.

Bain's life after acquittal
Following his acquittal, Bain undertook a three-month European holiday paid for by his supporters. Ten months later, he was struggling to find work and had no money. Auckland defence lawyer Peter Williams QC said Bain would be suffering from the stigma experienced by ex-prisoners re-entering the workplace.

In March 2012, Bain was working for an engineering firm in Auckland. In September 2012, he became engaged to his girlfriend Liz Davies, a Christchurch primary school teacher, and they were married on 10 January 2014. Bain was working for a Christchurch engineering firm at the time his wife gave birth to a baby boy on 3 December 2014.

In May 2017, Bain changed his name from David Cullen Bain to William David Cullen Davies, taking his wife Liz's surname. That year, they had a daughter, who was named Sophie Arawa Carolyn Davies, in honour of David's late sister Arawa.

In June 2017, the Crown began disposing of exhibits used in the trials. Crown Law decided it had no legal grounds on which to retain items belonging to Bain, and his .22-caliber Winchester Model 490 semi-automatic rifle and items of clothing would be returned to him through Karam.

In popular culture
The jumpers worn by Bain during the original trial, knitted by Margaret Bain to David's own designs, became a symbol of the case. During the retrial, T-shirts inspired by the jumpers were sold online.

Reflecting the high level of public interest in his case, in 2009, David Bain was found by the Internet search engine Google to be the most-searched-for New Zealander of the past year.

The December Brother, a 2010 play produced by Tim Spite for Wellington's Downstage Theatre, depicts re-enactments of the Bain family killings. The play was based on the theories put forward by the legal teams for the defence and prosecution during the trials.

Black Hands, a 10-episode podcast covering the case, by Christchurch journalist Martin van Beynen, was launched on 20 July 2017. Van Beynen released a one–episode sequel podcast in response to a radio interview of former judge Ian Binnie by Kim Hill, in September 2017.

The story was retold by TVNZ in the 2020 television drama series Black Hands, which premiered on 31st October. Producers made the show against the wishes of the surviving family, with the programme focusing on the family's lives and conflicts prior to the murder. The series also aired in the United Kingdom in August 2022 on Channel 4, under the title The Bain Family Murders.

See also
 Arthur Allan Thomas
 List of unsolved deaths
 Jeremy Bamber
 Teina Pora
 List of massacres in New Zealand

Notes

References

Further reading

 Joe Karam. David and Goliath: the Bain family murders (Auckland: Reed, 1997) 
 James McNeish. The Mask of Sanity: The Bain Murders (Auckland: David Ling, 1997) .
 Joe Karam. Bain and Beyond (Auckland: Reed, 2000) 
 Joe Karam. Innocent!: seven critical flaws in the conviction of David Bain, 2001 [a booklet]. 
 Joe Karam. Trial By Ambush: The Prosecutions of David Bain, 2012 
 Judith Wolfe and Trevor Reeves. In the Grip of Evil: The Bain Murders (Dunedin: Square One Press, 2003) 
 Michael Sharp. The Bain Killings Whodunnit?  :

External links
News media coverage:
David Bain trial, stuff
Bain retrial, Otago Daily Times
David Bain News, TVNZ
David Bain, 3News
David Bain Case, The New Zealand Herald
 David Bain case timeline, govt.nz
 Application for Royal Prerogative of Mercy: David Cullen Bain, Ministry of Justice (New Zealand)
 David Bain Case crime.co.nz, commercial web site

Family murders
Mass murder in 1994
Mass murder in New Zealand
Murder in New Zealand
Unsolved mass murders
Unsolved murders in New Zealand
June 1994 events in New Zealand
1990s in Dunedin
1994 murders in New Zealand